Staying Power is the twentieth and final studio album by American R&B singer Barry White, released on July 27, 1999.  The album was White's first release for five years, and his only recording for the Private Music label, with whom he had signed following a four-album deal with A&M which had culminated in 1994 with the acclaimed The Icon Is Love, his most successful album since the 1970s.

Staying Power features duets with Chaka Khan and Lisa Stansfield.  These are the only White tracks with a shared vocal credit, apart from the 1981 duet album Barry and Glodean. Lead single "Staying Power", although not a significant hit, won White two Grammy Awards in 2000 in the categories Best Male R&B Vocal Performance and Best Traditional R&B Vocal Performance.  It also contains covers of War's "Low Rider", which seems tailor-made for White's voice and a slowed-down version of Sly and The Family Stone's "Thank You (Falettinme Be Mice Elf Again)" (done the same way Sly recorded it on his "There's A Riot Goin' On' album) with a rap by a rapper solely identified as Mr. Rogers. Staying Power was less successful than The Icon Is Love, peaking at #13 on the R&B chart and #43 on the pop chart.  Similarly, its critical reception was more mixed, the overall opinion tending to the view that while there is little to find fault with, the material and production is less distinguished than had been the case with The Icon Is Love.  (Allmusic reviewer Stephen Erlewine for example describes Staying Power as "...classy and entertaining, but [it] doesn't add to the legacy".)

Track listing
 "Staying Power" (Rory Holmes, Joey Paschal) - 6:10
 "Don't Play Games" (Barry White, Jack Perry, Steve Guillory) - 7:24
 "The Longer We Make Love" (White, Aaron Schroeder, Marlon Saunders) - 5:48 (duet with Chaka Khan)
 "I Get Off on You" (White, Perry, Kashif) - 6:30
 "Which Way Is Up" (White, Perry, Doug Rasheed) - 5:42
 "Get Up" (White, Perry) - 6:11
 "Sometimes" (White) - 6:55
 "Low Rider" (Howard Scott, Charles Miller, Lee Oskar, Leroy Jordan, Jerry Goldstein, Morris Dickerson, Harold Brown, Sylvester Allen) - 5:17
 "Thank You (Falettinme Be Mice Elf Again)" (Sylvester Stewart) - 5:46
 "Slow Your Roll" (White, Perry, Paschal) - 5:46
 "The Longer We Make Love" (White, Schroeder, Saunders) - 6:27 (duet with Lisa Stansfield)

Charts

Weekly charts

Year-end charts

Singles
 "Staying Power" (US R&B #45)

Certifications and sales

References

Barry White albums
1999 albums
Private Music albums
Grammy Award for Best Traditional R&B Vocal Performance